Norman McGregor Robertson (August 26, 1897 – November 14, 1975) was a sailor from Canada, who represented his country at the 1924 Summer Olympics in Meulan, France.

References

Sources
 
 

Canadian male sailors (sport)
Sailors at the 1924 Summer Olympics – Monotype
Olympic sailors of Canada
Sportspeople from Hamilton, Ontario
1897 births
1975 deaths